Alca may refer to:
 Advanced Light Combat Aircraft; see Aero L-159 Alca
 Alca, a genus of birds
 Apostolic Lutheran Church of America
 The Free Trade Area of the Americas, known as Área de Libre Comercio de las Américas in Spanish, and Área de Livre Comércio das Américas in Portuguese
The Professional Landcare Network, previously known as the Associated Landscape Contractors of America